Coonamble Airport  is an airport located  south of Coonamble, New South Wales, Australia.

Airlines and destinations

There is no regular passenger transport to Coonamble Airport.  Prior to 2008 there was an Air Link Airlines link to Dubbo.

See also
List of airports in New South Wales

References

Airports in New South Wales